Droupadi Murmu (born 20 June 1958) is an Indian politician who is serving as the 15th and current President of India since 2022. She is the first person belonging to the tribal community and also the second woman after Pratibha Patil to hold the office. She is also the youngest person to occupy the post and the first President born in Independent India. She has also served as the governor of Jharkhand from the year 2015 to 2021. She has also previously served as a member of the Legislative Assembly from Odisha and minister of state of the Government of Odisha.

Before entering politics, she worked as a clerk in the State Irrigation and Power Department from 1979 to 1983, and then as a teacher in Rairangpur until 1997.

Personal life
Droupadi Murmu was born to a Santali family on 20 June 1958, in Uparbeda village in the Baidaposi area of Rairangpur, Odisha. Her father Biranchi Narayan Tudu was a farmer. Her father and grandfather were traditional heads (designated Sarpanch) of the village council (Gram Panchayat). Her family named her Puti Tudu. She was renamed by her school teacher to Droupadi, and her name was changed several times to those including Durpadi and Dorpdi in the past.

Murmu studied elementary education at the local primary school in Uparbeda. At age five, she moved to Bhubaneswar for higher studies. She completed secondary education from Girl's High School Unit-2, and graduated in B.A. from Rama Devi Women's College.

She married Shyam Charan Murmu, a banker, in 1980 with whom she had two sons and a daughter. Her husband, two sons, mother, and a brother all died in a span of 7 years, from 2009 to 2015. She is a follower of the Brahma Kumaris spiritual movement.

Murmu is an admirer of India's first prime minister, Jawaharlal Nehru. She has also hailed Mahatma Gandhi and B. R. Ambedkar.

Early career
From 1979 to 1983, Murmu worked as a junior assistant at the irrigation department of the Government of Odisha. From 1994 to 1997, she then worked as a teacher at the school Sri Aurobindo Integral Education and Research Centre in Rairangpur, where she taught Hindi, Odia, Maths and Geography. She never claimed for a full salary at the school.

Political career 
In 1997, Droupadi Murmu was elected as the councillor of the Rairangpur Nagar Panchayat as an independent candidate from a reserved seat for women. She then joined the Bharatiya Janata Party (BJP).

She won the 2000 Odisha Legislative Assembly election from Rairangpur Assembly constituency and served two terms in the Odisha Legislative Assembly between 2000 and 2009. During the BJP and BJD coalition government in Odisha, she was the Minister of State with Independent Charge for Commerce and Transportation from 6 March 2000 to 6 August 2002, and Fisheries and Animal Resources Development from 6 August 2002 to 16 May 2004.

In 2007, she received the Nilkanth Award for the Best MLA of the Odisha Legislative Assembly. In 2009, she lost the Lok Sabha election from Mayurbhanj Lok Sabha constituency as the BJD and BJP alliance had ended. She was elected to the BJP National Executive (ST Morcha) in 2013, and was the district president until 2015.

Governor of Jharkhand (2015–2021)

Murmu was sworn in as the Governor of Jharkhand on 18 May 2015, becoming the first woman to hold the position. The BJP was in power in the Jharkhand Government for most of her six-year tenure as a governor and was also in power in the Union Government throughout her tenure. She administered the oath of office to Hemant Soren as Chief Minister of Jharkhand in 2019.

Ratan Tirkey, a former BJP politician and activist, said that Murmu had not done enough to make sure that the self-governance rights granted to tribal communities were properly implemented. These rights were granted under the Fifth Schedule and the Panchayats (Extension to Scheduled Areas) Act, 1996 or PESA. Tirkey said, "Despite several requests, the then governor never exercised her powers to implement the Fifth Schedule provisions and Pesa in letter and spirit".

Her six-year tenure as Governor began in May 2015 and ended in July 2021.

Pathalgadi movement

In 2016–2017, the Raghubar Das ministry was seeking amendments to the Chhotanagpur Tenancy Act, 1908, and the Santhal Pargana Tenancy Act, 1949. These two original laws had safeguarded the rights of tribal communities on their land. According to the existing laws, land transactions could only be done between tribal communities. The new amendments gave the tribals the right to allow the government to make commercial use of tribal land and to take tribal land on lease. The proposed bill amending the existing law had been approved by the Jharkhand Legislative Assembly. The bills were sent to Murmu for approval in November 2016.

The tribal people had strongly objected to the proposed law. During the Pathalgadi movement, protests were held against the proposed amendments to the tenancy acts. In one incident, the protest turned violent and the tribals abducted the security detail of the BJP Member of Parliament Karia Munda. Police responded with a violent crack-down on tribal communities, that caused the death of a tribal man. Criminal cases were filed against more than 200 people including the tribal rights activist Stan Swamy. Murmu was criticized for her soft stand on police aggression against tribal communities during the movement. According to woman tribal rights activist  Aloka Kujur she was expected to speak up to the government in support of the tribals but this did not happen, and instead she appealed to the Pathalgarhi agitation leaders to repose faith in the constitution.
 
Murmu had received total of 192 memorandums against the amendments in the bill. Then opposition leader Hemant Soren had said that the BJP government wanted to acquire tribal land through the two amendment Bills for the benefit of corporates. Opposition parties Jharkhand Mukti Morcha, the Indian National Congress, the Jharkhand Vikas Morcha and others had put intense pressure against the bill. On 24 May 2017, Murmu relented and refused to give assent to the bills and returned the bill to the state government along with the memorandums she had received. The bill was later withdrawn in August 2017.

Religion and land bill
In 2017, she approved the Freedom of Religion Bill, 2017, and the bill to amend the Land Acquisition 2013 Act passed by the Jharkhand Assembly.

The new religion bill makes it an offence subject to a penalty of three years in prison, to coerce or lure a person to convert their religion. If the person coerced is a member of a Scheduled Caste or tribe, a minor, or female, the prison term increases to four years. Fines can be levied in any case. The bill also made it mandatory for voluntary converts, to inform the Deputy Commissioner about their conversion, and to give full details about the circumstances.

The amendments in the Land Acquisition Act, 2013, involved changes in the compensation duration and requirements for social impacts assessment. According to the passed law, monetary compensation for government acquisition of tribal land must be paid within six months of acquisition. The requirement for social impact assessments was dropped for some types of infrastructure projects.

Presidential campaign

In June 2022, the BJP nominated Murmu as the National Democratic Alliance (NDA)'s candidate for President of India for the 2022 election the following month. Yashwant Sinha, was nominated as the candidate for president by the opposition parties. During her election campaign, Murmu visited various states seeking support for her candidature. Several opposition parties like BJD, YSRCP, JMM, BSP, SS, JD(S) among others had announced support for her candidature prior to polling. On 21 July 2022, Murmu secured a clear majority in the 2022 Presidential election defeating common opposition candidate Yashwant Sinha with 676,803 electoral votes (64.03% of total) in 21 of the 28 states (including in the union territory of Puducherry) to become the 15th President of India.

Presidency (2022–present)

On 26 July 2022, Droupadi Murmu took oath as the 15th President of India, oath of which was administered by the 48th Chief Justice of India N. V. Ramana in the presence of former Presidents, Vice President, Prime Minister and other delegates.

She is the first person from India's designated tribal communities to be elected president. She is the youngest and first individual born after India's independence in 1947 to have been elected president. Murmu is only the second woman after Pratibha Patil to serve as President of India.

Murmu addressed the nation for the first time as the President of India, on 14 August 2022, Independence day eve. She greeted the citizens of the country on the 75th Independence.

In September 2022, she launched a government program 'Pradhanmantri TB mukht Bharat' - an initiative to eradicate Tuberculosis from the country. She became the first ever President of India, to inaugurate the 'Mysuru Dasara' a 10-day state festival in Karnataka. In the initial months, Murmu paid vast visits to the north-eastern states of the country including Assam, Mizoram, Nagaland and Sikkim and engaged in ceremonies of various development projects.

In November 2022, she paid her first visit to her home state Odisha after assuming the office of the President, to participate in the launch of various programmes. During this visit she visited her alma mater school and later interacted with school children along the sideways of the road and walked 2 kilometers to pay obeisance to the deities of Puri Jagannath Temple.

Electoral performance

See also

List of presidents of India
President of India
2022 Indian Presidential Election
List of Governors of Jharkhand

References

Further reading

External links

|-

|-

|-

1958 births
Living people
21st-century Indian politicians
21st-century Indian women politicians
Adivasi politicians
Bharatiya Janata Party politicians from Odisha
Female heads of state
Governors of Jharkhand
Odisha MLAs 2000–2004
Odisha MLAs 2004–2009
People from Mayurbhanj district
Presidents of India
Santali people
Women in Odisha politics
Women presidents
Women state governors of India